= Resi (company) =

UK architectural technology company

Resi is a UK-based online architectural platform founded in 2017 by Alexandra Depledge and Jules Coleman. The company delivers residential home renovation services to UK homeowners.

== History ==
Resi was founded in 2017 as BuildPath following the sale of Hassle.com in 2015 by co-founders Depledge and Coleman. Their experience with a failed home extension motivated them to create a more transparent architectural service.

In March 2023, ITV acquired a minority stake in Resi in exchange for up to £3 million of advertising inventory across ITV's Channels.

In October 2024, the company raised £5 million in a funding round led by Nesta and Foresight, valuing the company at £20 million.

In January 2025, Nesta Impact Investments announced backing for Resi.
